This is a list of notable beaches in the Philippines sorted by province.

Bicol

Albay
 Bacacay
 Hindi Beach
 Pinamuntugan Beach
 Coron-Coron Beach
 Panarayon Beach
 Sogod Beach
 Cabungahan Beach
 Manito
 Ilologan Beach
 Rapu-Rapu
 Batan Island
 Guinanayan Island
 Tabaco
 San Lorenzo Beach
 Punta Beach
 Tiwi
 Joroan Beach

Camarines Norte

 Daet
 Bagasbas Beach
 Mercedes
 Apuao Grande Island
 Caringo Island
 Paracale
 Maculabo Island
 Vinzons
 Calaguas Islands
 Guintinua Island
 Tinaga Island

Camarines Sur

 Balatan
 Animasola Island
 Iligrande Beaches
 Caramoan
 Cotivas Island
 Gota Island
 Hunongan Island
 Lahos Island
 Lahuy Island
 Matukad Island
 Minalahos Island
 Pitogo Island
 Sabitang Laya Island
 Tinago Island
Del Gallego, Camarines Sur
 Sta. Rita Island Beach Resort
 Garchitorena
 Isla de Monteverde
 Pinaglukaban Island
 del Pilar Group of Islands
 Lagonoy
 San Jose Beach
 Mater Fatima Sanctuary
 Longori Beach
 Santa Cruz Beach
 Minalabac
 Bagolatao Beach
 San Isidro Beachfront Park
 Pasacao
 Daruanac Island
 Balogo Beach
 Caranan Beach
 Dipaluog Beaches
 Sagñay
 Nato Beachfront Complex I
 Nato Beachfront Complex II
 Patitinan Beach
 Atulayan Island
 Mabca Beahcront Park
 Siruma
 Bahao Beaches
 Malaconini Coastal Reserve
 Tandoc Marine Sanctuary
 Tinambac
 Tamban Beaches
 Bagacay Beaches
 Holmoga Beach

Catanduanes

 Baras
 Puraran Beach
 Virac
 Cabugao Beach
 Twin Rock Beach

Masbate

 
 Aroroy
 Cambatang Beach
 Cangcayat Beach
 Napayauan Island
 Tinigban Beach
 Claveria
 Ki-albay Beach
  Island
 San Isidro Beach
 Dimasalang
 Daquit-Daquit Island
 Magcaraget Island
 Veagan Island
 Masbate
 Buntud Beach
 Monreal
 Cagpating Island
 Placer
 Nagarao Island
 San Fernando
 Talisay Beach
 San Pascual
 Sombrero Island
 Tinalisay Island

Sorsogon

 Bulan
 Sabang Beach
 Bulusan
 Dancalan Beach
 Gubat
 Rizal Beach
 Magallanes
 Bagatao Island
 Matnog
 Calintaan Island
 Juag Island
 Subic Island
 Tikling Island
 Sorsogon
 Libanon Beach
 Paguriran Island
 Tolong Gapo Beach

Cagayan Valley

Batanes
 Basco
 Valugan Boulder Beach
 Mahatao
 Madiwedved Surf Beach
 Sabtang
 Ivuhos Island
 Nakabuang Beach
 Sabtang Cove

Cagayan
 Aparri
 Barit Island
 Fuga Island
 Calayan
 Babuyan Claro Island
 Calayan Island
 Camiguin Island
 Centro Beach
 Dalupiri Island
 Sibang Cove
 Claveria
 Centinela Beach
 Ubing-Ubing Beach
Sanchez Mira
 Masisit
 Santa Ana
 Anguib Beach
 Cape Engaño
 Manidad (Crocodile) Island
 Palaui Island
 San Vicente Island

Isabela
 Divilacan
 Honeymoon Island
 Oway Beach
 Palanan
 Dicotcotan Beach
 Didadungan Beach

Caraga

Agusan del Norte
 Buenavista
 Tinago Beach
 Cabadbaran
 Dagani Beach
 Carmen
 Bolihon Beach
 Vinapor Beach
 Nasipit
 Ata-atahon Beach
 Cubu-Cubi Beach

Dinagat Islands
 Del Pilar
 Hinabian Beach
 Basilisa
 Bitaug Beach
 Sundayo Beach
 Libjo
 Pangabangan Island
 Pig-ot Hideaway Beach
 Loreto
 Sangay Beach and Dive Site
 San Jose
 Baing Beach and Dive Site
 Santa Cruz Beach

Surigao del Norte
 Burgos
 Alegria Beach
 Dapa
 Corregidor Island
 Giwan Beach
 Pansukian Island
 Union Beach
 Del Carmen
 Caub Beach
 General Luna
 Daku Islet
 Guyam Islet
 Naked Islet
 Siargao Island
 Pilar
 Duot Beach
 Caridad Beach
 Lukod Beach
 Magpupungko Beach
 Taglungnan Beach
 San Isidro
 Pacifico Beach
 Santa Monica
 Alegria Beach
 Socorro, Surigao del Norte
 Bucas Grande Island
 Puyangi Beach
 Sohoton Beach
 Surigao
 Lipata Beach
 Mabua Beach

Surigao del Sur
 Barobo
 Cabgan Island
 Licanto Beach
 Cagwait
 White Beach
 Cantilan
 Baybay (San Pedro) Beach
 General Island
 Cortes
 Rock Beach
 Lanuza
 Doot Poktoy Beach
 Lianga
 Kansilad Beach
 San Agustin
 Britania Island
 Tandag
 Mabua Beach
 Mancangangi Island

Central Luzon

Aurora
 Baler
 Cemento Beach
 Digisit Beach
 Casiguran
 Casapsapan Beach
 Dalugan Beach
 Diniog Beach
 San Ildefonso Peninsula
 Dilasag
 Canawer Beach
 Dipaculao
 Ampere Beach
 Borlongan Beach
 Dinadiawan Beach
 San Luis
 Dibut Bay
 Dicasalarin Bay

Bataan
 Bagac
 Costa Vida Privada
 Montemar Beach
 Playa La Caleta
 Quinawan Bay
 Saysain Beach
 Mariveles
 Agwawan Beach
 Camaya Coast (Wain)
 Lusong Beach
 Mawakis Cove
 Talaga Beach
 Morong
 Anvaya Cove
 Camayan Beach
 Nagbalayong Beach
 Sabang Beach
 West Nuk Cove

Zambales
 Candelaria
 Potipot Island
 Uacon Beach
 Masinloc
 San Salvador Island
 Olongapo
 Baloy Long Beach
 Barrio Barretto Beach
 Chiquita Island
 Grande Island
 Waterfront Boardwalk Beach
 Palauig
 Magalawa Island
 Matalvis Island
 San Antonio
 Anawangin Cove
 Camara Island
 Capones Island
 Nagsasa Cove
 Pundaquit Beach
 Silaguin Cove
 Talisayan Cove
 San Narciso
 La Paz Beach
 Santa Cruz
 Hermana Mayor Island
 Hermana Menor Island
 Longos Beach
 Lucapon Beach
 Malabago Beach
 Sabang Beach
 Subic
 Cawag Cove
 Matain Beach
 Pamana (Pequeña) Island
 Redondo Beach

Soccsksargen

Sarangani
 Glan
 Gumasa Beach
 Lago Beach
 Margus Beach
 Taluya Beach
 Kiamba
 Tuka Beach

South Cotabato
 General Santos
 London Beach
 Veterans Beach

Sultan Kudarat
 Lebak
 Sodoy Beach
 Kalamansig
 Balot Island
 Dumangas Nuevo Beach
 Poral Beach
 Santiac Beach
 Palimbang
 Alidama Island

Central Visayas

Bohol
 Alburquerque
 Santa Fe Beach
 Anda
 Bas Daku Beach
 Bugnao Beach
 Candabong Beach
 Kinale Beach
 Baclayon
 Laya Beach
 Pamilacan Island
 Dauis
 Bikini Beach
 Bingag Beach
 Dao Beach
 San Isidro Beach
 Dimiao
 Imelda Beach
 Duero
 Duero Beach
 Jagna
 Canuba Beach
 Loay
 Clarin Beach
 Loon
 Cabilao Island
 Lintuan Beach
 Panglao
 Alona Beach
 Bagobo Beach
 Balicasag Island
 Bolod Beach
 Danao Beach
 Doljo Beach
 Dumaloan Beach
 Gak-ang Island
 Libaong Beach
 Momo Beach
 Panglao Island
 Puntod (Virgin) Island
 President Carlos P. Garcia
 Aquining Beach
 Tagbilaran
 Kain-git Beach
 Talibon
 Bansaan Island

Cebu
 Alcoy
 Tingko Beach
 Alegria
 Madridejos Beach
 Aloguinsan
 Cantabogon Beach
 Argao
 Looc Beach
 Tulic Beach
 Badian
 Zaragoza Island
 Bantayan
 Botigues Island
 Doong Island
 Hilotongan Island
 Lipayran Island
 Silion (Virgin) Island
 Yao Island
 Barili
 Sayaw Beach
 Bogo
 Capitancillo Island
 Carmen
 Hinagdanan Beach
 Cordova
 Gilutongan Island
 Nalusuan Island
 Daanbantayan
 Carnaza Island
 Malapascua Island
 Lapu-Lapu
 Buyong Beach
 Caohagan Island
 Cumungi Island
 Mactan Island
 Maribago Beach
 Marigondon Beach
 Olango Islands
 Pangan-an Island
 Punta Engaño
 Suba Basbas Beach
 Sulpa Islet
 Madridejos
 Bunacan Beach
 Malbago Beach
 Medellin
 Jibitnil Island
 Kawit Beach
 Tindog Beach
 Moalboal
 Panagsama Beach
 Pescador Island
 Saavedra (Bas Daku) Beach
 Oslob
 Sumilon Island
 Tan-awan Beach
 Pilar
 Cawit Beach
 Naukban Beach
 Poro
 Boho Beach
 Guiwanon Beach
 San Fernando
 San Isidro (Pulchra) Beach
 San Francisco
 Esperanza Beach
 Mangodlong Rock Beach
 Santiago Beach
 Tulang Island
 San Remigio
 Anapog Beach
 Hagnaya Beach
 Punta Sabil
 Tambongon Beach
 Santa Fe
 Guintacan Island
 Hilantagaan Island
 Maricaban Beach
 Okoy Beach
 Sugar Beach
 Santander
 Liloan Beach
 Looc Beach
 Sogod
 Calumboyan Beach
 Tabuela
 Maravilla Beach
 Tabunok Beach
 Tudela
 Mag-agay-ay Beach

Siquijor
 Maria
 Salagdoong Beach

Davao

Davao del Norte
 Samal
 Buenavista Island
 Kaputian Beach
 Malipano Island
 Samal Island
 Talicud Island

Davao Occidental
 Sarangani
 Balut Island
 Sarangani Island

Davao Oriental
 Baganga
 Baculin Beach
 Governor Generoso
 Lavigan Beach
 Pundaguitan Beach
 Lupon
 Aroma Beach
 Manay
 Tagtalisay Beach
 Mati
 Dahican Beach
 Mayo Beach
 Oak Island
 Pujada Island
 Waniban Island
 San Isidro
 Batobato Beach

Eastern Visayas

Biliran
 Almeria
 Agta Beach
 Dalutan Island
 Culaba
 Looc Beach
 Kawayan
 Cogon Beach
 Ginuroan Island
 Tingkasan Island
 Maripipi
 Candol Beach
 Maripipi Island
 Napo Beach
 Sambawan Island
 Naval
 Banderahan Beach
 Capiñahan Island
 Higatangan Island

Eastern Samar
 Borongan
 Boulevard Beach
 Divinuvo Island
 Guitagican Beach
 Dolores
 Kaybani Island
 Hernani
 Canhugas Beach
 Guiuan
 Calicoan Island
 Homonhon Island
 Kantican Island
 Sapao Beach
 Sulangan Beach
 Suluan Island
 Tubabao Island
 Maydolong
 Minasngi Beach
 Salcedo
 Buabua (Mercedes) Beach
 San Julian
 Liliputan Beach
 Taft
 Macalayo Island

Leyte
 Barugo
 De Guia Beach
 Capoocan
 Zapatos Island
 Hindang
 Cuatro Islas
 Apid Island
 Himokilan Island
 Inopacan
 Cuatro Islas
 Digyo Island
 Mahaba Island
 Matalom
 Canigao Island
 Palo
 Red Beach
 Palompon
 Calangaman Island
 Tacloban
 Blue Beach
 San Jose White Beach
 Tolosa
 Olot Beach
 Tadyaw Beach

Northern Samar
 Biri
 Talisay Beach
 Bobon
 Dancalan Beach
 Capul
 Abak Beach
 Catarman
 Alma Beach
 Langtaran Beach
 Tamburusan Beach
 White Beach
 Laoang
 Onay Beach
 Lavezares
 Bani Island
 Palapag
 Cabatuan Beach
 Talalora Beach
 San Roque
 Catawgan Beach
 San Vicente
 Panganoron Beach

Samar
 Calbayog
 Bagacay Beach
 Binaliw Isle
 Malajog Beach
 Naga Beach
 Payao Beach
 Catbalogan
 Basiao Island Beach
 Payao Beach
 Buri Baras Beach
 Malatugawi Island Beach
 Sunshine Beach
 Cal-apog Beach
 Marabut
 Kalabuso Beach
 Kapuroan Islets
 Marabut Marine Park
 Basey
 San Antonio Beach
 Samar Leyte Beach
 Bacubac Beach
 Tingib Beach

Southern Leyte
 Hinunangan
 San Pablo Island
 San Pedro Island
 Tahusan Beach
 Liloan
 Bitu-on Beach
 Maamo Beach
 Panaon Island
 Macrohon
 Kuting Beach
 Padre Burgos
 Limasawa Island
 Tancaan Beach
 Saint Bernard
 Kissbon Cove resort
 hindag-an falls
 Saob beach

Ilocos

Ilocos Norte
 Badoc
 Badoc Island
 Bangui
 Pebble Beach
 Burgos
 Capurpuraoan Beach
 Currimao
 Pangil Beach
 Laoag
 La Paz Beach
 Monroe Island
 Sabangan Beach
 Pagudpud
 Caparispisan Beach
 Mairaira Cove
 Pansian Beach
 Saud Beach
 Paoay
 Calayab Beach
 Puro Beach
 Suba Beach
 Pasuquin
 Dirique Beach
 Sexy (Estancia) Beach

Ilocos Sur
 Cabugao
 Pug-os Beach
 Salomague Island
 Candon
 Darapidap Beach
 Magsingal
 Pinget Island
 Narvacan
 Solvec Beach
 San Esteban
 Apatot Beach
 Santa Maria
 Nalvo Beach
 Suso Beach
 Santiago
 Ambucao Beach
 Butol Beach
 Gabao Beach
 Sabangan Cove
 Sinait
 Cabangtalan Beach
 Vigan
 Mindoro Beach

La Union
 Bauang
 Baccuit Sur Beach
 Paringao Beach
 Taberna Beach
 San Fernando
 Canaoay Beach
 Carlatan Beach
 Poro Point
 Wallace Beach
 San Juan
 Panicsican Beach
 Urbiztondo Beach

Pangasinan
 Agno, Pangasinan
 Abagatanen Beach
 Alaminos
 Bolo Beach
 Hundred Islands
 Anda
 Tanduyong Island
 Tondol Beach
 Bani
 Olanen Beach
 Surip Beach
 Bolinao
 Balingasay Beach
 Ilog-Malino Beach
 Patar Beach
 Santiago Island
 Silaqui Island
 Burgos
 Cabongaoan Beach
 Dagupan
 Bonuan Tondaligan Beach
 Pugaro Beach
 Dasol
 Balinmanok Beach
 Colibra Island
 Tambobong Beach
 Infanta
 Balaki Island
 Sabangan Beach
 Lingayen
 Lingayen Long Beach
 San Fabian
 Bolasi Beach
 Center Beach
 Mabilao Beach

Bangsamoro Autonomous Region in Muslim Mindanao (BARMM)

Basilan
 Isabela
 Malamawi Island
 Sumagdang Beach

Sulu
 Jolo
 Marungas Island
 Patikul
 Maubo Beach

Tawi-Tawi
 Mapun
 Gusong Reef
 Turtle Islands
 Turtle Islands National Park

Negros Island

Negros Occidental
 Cadiz
 Lakawon Island
 Sicaba Beach
 Calatrava
 Palau Beach
 Cauayan
 Bulata Island
 Danjugan Island
 Punta Bulata
 Escalante
 Jomabo Island
 Marino Del Norte Beach
 Hinoba-an
 Bolila Island
 Pontevedra
 Balangigay Beach
 Royal Villa Beach
 Sagay
 Molocaboc Island
 San Carlos
 Refugio Island
 Sipalay
 Campomanes Beach
 Langub Beach
 Punta Ballo

Negros Oriental
 Bais
 Lag-it Beach purok talisay
 Mapao Sand Bar
 Talabong Island
 Dauin
 Apo Island
 Atmosphere Resorts Beach
 La Libertad
 San Jose Beach
 Manjuyod
 Manjuyod Sand Bar
 Siaton
 Antulang Beach
 Tambobo Beach
 Zamboanguita
 Talatha Beach

Northern Mindanao

Camiguin
 Guinsiliban
 Kabila Beach
 Mahinog
 Mantigue Island
 Mambajao
 Agoho Beach
 White Island

Lanao del Norte
 Bacolod
 Rupagan Beach
 Maigo
 Balagatasa Beach
 Sultan Naga Dimaporo
 Pikalawag Beach

Misamis Occidental
 Baliangao
 Cabgan (Oklahoma) Island
 Palmera Beach
 Sunrise Beach
 Clarin
 Lupagan Beach
 Jimenez
 Palilan Beach
 Panaon
 Dela Paz Beach
 Regalado's Beach Resort
 Lopez Jaena
 Capayas Island
 Mansabay Beach
 Oroquieta
 El Triunfo Beach
 Romero Beach
 San Vicente Alto Beach
 Plaridel
 Bao-Baon (Seven) Islands
 Sapang Dalaga
 Naputhaw Island
 Pulang Bato Beach
 Sinacaban
 Dolphin Island
 Tangub
 Maloro Beach

Misamis Oriental
 Balingasag
 Mambayaan Beach
 Balingoan
 Mantangale Alibuag Beach
 Palma Beach
 Binuangan
 Mempepe Beach
 Saint Bernadette Beach
 Cagayan de Oro
 Gemini Beach
 Gusa Beach
 El Salvador
 Molugan Beach
 Molugan Shoal
 Gingoog
 Badiangon Beach
 Initao
 Bubotan Beach
 Jasaan
 Agutayan Island
 Punta Gorda Beach
 Kinoguitan
 Bolisong Beach
 Lagonglong
 Kauswagan Beach
 Laguindingan
 Birhen Milagrosa Beach
 Manticao
 Punta Silum Beach
 Medina
 Duka Beach
 Naawan
 Maputi Beach
 Opol
 Taboc Beach
 Salay
 Limpatugao Beach
 Sugbongcogon
 Alibuag Beach
 Alicomohan Beach
 Kiraging Beach
 Talisay
 Kalamkam Beach
 Talines Beach
 Villanueva
 Looc Beach

Mimaropa

Marinduque
 Buenavista
 Elephant (Bellarocca) Island
 Gasan
 Baltazar Island
 Gaspar Island
 Melchor Island
 Santa Cruz
 Maniwaya Island
 Torrijos
 Poctoy Beach

Occidental Mindoro
 Looc
 Ambil Island
 Golo Island
 Lubang
 Cabra Island
 Lubang Island
 Natalon Beach
 Mamburao
 Tayamaan Beach
 Sablayan
 Pandan Grande Island
 San Jose
 Ambulog Island
 Binantgaan Island
 Cajos del Bajo Island
 Ilin Island
 White Island

Oriental Mindoro
 Baco
 Alibatan Island
 Calapan
 Suqui Beach
 Pinamalayan
 Banilad Beach
 Bongol Beach
 Puerto Galera
 Aninuan Beach
 Balatero Cove
 Balete Beach
 Big La Laguna Beach
 Boquete Island
 Coral Cove
 Encenada Beach
 Hondura Beach
 Markoe Cove
 Minolo Cove
 Muelle Beach
 Punta Guarda Beach
 Sabang Beach
 San Antonio Island
 Small La Laguna Beach
 Talipanan Beach
 White Beach
 Roxas
 Melco Beach

Palawan
 Busuanga
 Black Island
 Calumbuyan Island
 Dibutonay Island
 Dimakya Island
 Dimipac Island
 Dumunpalit Island
 North Cay Island
 South Cay Island
 Teardrop Island
 West Nalaut Island
 Cagayancillo
 Bird Islet
 North Atoll
 South Atoll
 Coron
 Atwayan Beach
 Banana Island
 Banol Beach
 Cagbatan (CYC) Island
 Dibatoc Island
 Diwaran Island
 Malaroyroy Island
 Malcapuya Island
 San Jose Beach
 Sangat Island
 Cuyo
 Amanpulo (Pamalican) Island
 Capusan Beach
 Manamoc Island
 Dumaran
 Bacao Beach
 Calampuan Island
 Rinambacan Island
 Pamalatan Island
 San Juan Beach
 El Nido
 Buena Suerte Beach
 Cadlao Island
 Calitang Beach
 Commando Island
 Dilumacad Island
 Dolarog Beach
 Entalula Island
 Lagen Island
 Malapacao Island
 Matinloc Island
 Marimegmeg Beach
 Miniloc Island

 Nacpan Beach
 Pangalusian Island
 Pinagbuyatan Island
 Pinasil Island
 Shimizu Island
 Vigan (Snake) Island
 Kalayaan
 Pag-asa Island
 Linapacan
 Cagdanao Island
 Magsaysay
 Quijano Beach
 Puerto Princesa

 Arrecife (Dos Palmas) Island
 Fondeado Island
 Luli Island
 Nagtabon Beach
 Napsan Beach
 Pandan Island
 Sabang Beach
 Señorita Island
 Snake Island
 Roxas
 Coco Loco Island
 San Vicente
 Boayan Island
 Cacnipa Island
 Long Beach
 Port Barton
 Taytay
 Apulit Island
 Castle Island
 Coral Island
 Flower Island
 Quimbaludan Island
 Tagbulo Island

Romblon
 Alcantara
 Aglicay Beach
 Calagonsao Beach
 Banton
 Banton Island
 Bantoncillo Island
 Carlota Island
 Isabel Island
 Polloc Island
 Concepcion
 Maestro de Campo Island
 Romblon
 Alad Islet
 Bonbon Beach
 Canyayo
 Cobrador Island
 Japar Islet
 Taimban Beach
 San Fernando
 Cresta de Gallo Island
 San Jose
 Carabao Island
 Santa Fe
 Cabahan Island
 Sta. Maria, Romblon (Little Boracay)

Calabarzon

Batangas
 Batangas
 Verde Island
 Calatagan
 Balibago Beach
 Santa Ana Beach
 Burot Beach
 Lian
 Matabungkay Beach
 Lobo
 Gerthel Beach
 Malabrigo Beach
 Olo-Olo Beach
 Sawang Beach
 Soloc Beach
 Submarine Garden
 Mabini
 Anilao Beach
 Balangit Beach
 San Teodoro Beach
 Solo Beach
 Nasugbu
 Calayo Beach
 Fortune Island
 Hamilo Coast
 Munting Buhangin Beach
 Natipunan Beach
 Punta Fuego
 Tali Beach
 Twin Island
 San Juan
 Hugon Beach
 Laiya Beach
 Mahabang Buhangin Beach
 Tingloy
 Culebra Island
 Masasa Beach
 Maricaban Island
 Sombrero Island

Cavite
 Maragondon
 Carabao Island
 Limbones Cove
 Santa Mercedes Beach
 Ternate
 Calumpang (Marine Base) Beach
 Caylabne Cove
 Paniman Bay
 Puerto Azul

Quezon
 Buenavista
 Cawa Beach
 Cabong Beach
 Mabutag Beach
 Burdeos
 Anilon Island
 Bakaw-Bakaw Island
 Binombonan Island
 Ikulong Island
 Isla  Bato
 Catanauan
 Catanauan Cove
 Gatasan Beach
 Infanta
 Santa Monica Beach
 Jomalig
 Casuguran Beach
 Manlanat Island
 Mauban
 Alitap Beach
 Cagbalete Island
 Mulanay
 Long Beach
 Malaking Bato Beach
 Padre Burgos
 Basiao Beach
 Borawan Beach
 Dampalitan Island
 Lipata Island
 Talabaan Islands
 Tulay Buhangin
 Pagbilao
 Bantigue Beach
 Grande Island
 Patayan Island
  Buhangin/Cuebang Lampas Beach
 Patnanungan
 Sila Beach
 Polillo
 Balesin Island
 Bird Island
 Polillo Island
 Real
 Baluti Island

Western Visayas

Aklan
 Batan
 Tabon Island
 Buruanga
 Palm Ville
 Talisay Beach
 Tuburan Beach
 Malay
 Boracay Island
 Balinghai Beach
 Bulabog Beach
 Cagban Beach
 Diniwid Beach
 Manoc-Manoc Beach
 Puka Shell Beach
 Tambisaan Beach
 Tulubhan Beach
 White Beach
 Yapak Beach
 Crocodile Island
 Laurel Island

Antique
 Anini-y
 Nogas Island
 Caluya
 Sibato Island
 Sibay Island
 Culasi
 Batbatan Island
 Mararison Island
 Libertad
 Punta Pucio
 Pandan
 Duyong Golden Beach
 Mag-aba Beach
 Patria Beach
 Tingib Beach
 Tibiao 
 Seco Island

Capiz
 Pilar
 Casanayan Beach
 Roxas
 Baybay Beach
 Olotayan Island
 Ayagao Beach
 Ivisan
 Balaring Beach
 Basiao Beach

Guimaras
 Buenavista
 East Valencia Beach
 Jordan
 Ave Maria Islet
 Baras Beach
 Isla Naburot
 Tatlong Pulo Beach
 Nueva Valencia
 Alubijod Beach
 Guisi Beach
 Tando Beach
 Tiniguiban Islet
 San Lorenzo
 San Enrique Beach
 Sibunag
 Inampulugan Island
 Nagarao Island

Iloilo
 Ajuy
 Marbuena Island
 Nasidman Beach
 Barotac Viejo
 Balaring Beach
 Carles
 Antonia Beach
 Binuluangan Island
 Cabugao Islet
 Calagnaan Island
 Gigantillo Island
 Isla de Gigantes Norte
 Isla de Gigantes Sur
 Sicogon Island
 Concepcion
 Agho Island
 Bolobadiangan Island
 Igbon Island
 Pan de Azucar Island
 Pulo Piña Island
 Tago Island
 Tambaliza Beach
 Iloilo
 Villa Beach
 Oton
 Anhawan Beach
 Villa Rica Beach
 San Joaquin
 Basang Basa Beach
 Bogtong Bato Beach
 Tobog Beach
 Tigbauan
 Namocon Beach
 Parara Beach

Zamboanga Peninsula

Zamboanga del Norte
 Dapitan
 Aliguay Island
 Dakak Beach
 Selinog Island
 Taguilon Cove
 Dipolog
 Sicayab Beach
 Sibutad
 Piñahun Island

Zamboanga del Sur
 Pagadian
 Bomba Beach
 Dao-Dao Islands
 Muricay Beach
 Poloyagan Beach
 Pitogo
 Panikian Island
 Tukuran
 Baguio Beach
 Zamboanga City
 Isla Baong
 Isla Bobo
 Isla Buguias
 Isla Gran Santa Cruz
 Isla Lambang
 Isla Malanipa
 Isla Pequeña Santa Cruz
 Isla Pitas
 Isla Sacol
 Isla Salangan
 Isla Visa
 Isla Vitali
 Playa Arcillas
 Playa Bolong
 Playa Caragasan
 Playa Cawa-Cawa
 Playa Labuan
 Playa San Ramon

Unsorted

 Great Santa Cruz Island, Zamboanga City
 Bantayan Island, Cebu
 El Nido, Palawan
 Coron, Palawan
 Caramoan Peninsula, Camarines Sur
 Balesin Island, Quezon
 Maira-ira Beach, Pagudpud
 Samal Island, Davao
 Nasugbu, Batangas
 Puerto Galera, Mindoro
 Honda Bay, Palawan
 San Vicente, Palawan
 Malapascua Island, Cebu
 Amanpulo, Pamalican, Palawan
 Misibis Bay, Cagraray Island, Albay
 Boracay, Aklan
 Panglao Island, Bohol
 Camaya Coast, Bataan
 Mactan Island, Cebu
 Bagolatao, Minalabac, Camarines Sur

See also
 List of beaches

References

Philippines Paradise
List of Beaches in the Philippines

Beaches
Beaches
Philippines